Nikola Ležaić (born August 6, 1981) is a Serbian film director, screenwriter and film producer.

Biography
Being very much into alternative culture since his teens, he used to draw comics with the local comic group called Smog. Ležaić co-founded literary movement called Metasynchrism. He graduated at the Faculty of Dramatic Arts in Belgrade. He is mostly known for his first feature film Tilva Roš produced by Film House Kiselo Dete. It is praised as arguably the most internationally acclaimed Serbian film of the last decade  and it earned Nikola an EFA Discovery Award Nomination in 2011.

Since 2009, he is the owner of the production company Smog Entertainment formed as a sister company of Film House Kiselo Dete. As the company's website says, Smog is the result of Nikola's urge to produce quirky moviegoer films that don't fit any profile. Smog rather chooses a lifeful mountain path than a safe freeway.

He worked as a producer on two projects, Neposlušni directed by Mina Đukić and Pogledaj me, Kusturice by Uroš Tomić.  He is also preparing his new film project.

Further reading 
Mirko Milivojevic, Introducing Wounds: "Challenging the 'Crap Theory of Pain' in Nikola Lezaić's Tilva Roš", in: Structures of Feeling. Affectivity and the Study of Culture, edited by Devika Sharma and Frederik Tygstrup, de Gruyter, 2015, p. 58–65.

References

External links
 

1981 births
People from Bor, Serbia
Serbian film directors
Serbian screenwriters
Male screenwriters
Serbian film producers
Living people
University of Belgrade Faculty of Dramatic Arts alumni